Eddison Jonasi Mudadirwa Zvobgo (2 October 1935 – 22 August 2004) was a founder of Zimbabwe's ruling party, ZANU–PF, the Patriotic Front's spokesman at the Lancaster House in late 1979, a Harvard-trained lawyer, a hotelier and a poet.

His name is often misspelled by the media, either as "Edson" instead of Eddison or "Zvogbo" instead of Zvobgo.

Zvobgo was born in then Southern Rhodesia in 1935, near Fort Victoria (now Masvingo), where his father was a minister in the Dutch Reformed Church. He comes from the Karanga subgroup of the Shona people. In 1960, Zvobgo won a scholarship to Tufts University in Boston, Massachusetts aged 25. After taking a bachelor's degree there in 1964, he returned home to be arrested and detained for political activism against white rule in Rhodesia, along with Robert Mugabe and Joshua Nkomo.

He was freed in 1971, and he spent a period in exile in Canada. He then studied law at Harvard University and International Relations at The Fletcher School of Law and Diplomacy, followed by a position as associate professor of criminal law at Lewis University College of Law in Illinois.

Zvobgo played a key role in international negotiations at Lancaster House that ended the bitter Rhodesian Bush War and led to British-sponsored all-race elections ahead of Zimbabwe's independence in 1980. He was the Zanu-PF spokesman, and impressed many in the international press with his quick repartee and astute analysis of the negotiations. In the 1980 elections, he won a seat in Parliament for Masvingo, which he continued to hold until his death.

An influential member of Zimbabwe's first fully independent cabinet, Zvobgo was Minister of Local Government and Housing until 1982, and Minister of Justice until 1985. In 1987, he had become Zimbabwe's Minister of Parliamentary and Constitutional Affairs and it was in this capacity that he made several amendments to Zimbabwe's Constitution.

Initially a staunch supporter of Zanu-PF policies, Zvobgo later criticized Robert Mugabe's autocratic rule.

In 1992, Zvobgo was moved to the less influential post of Minister of Mines. In 1996, Zvobgo survived a car accident, in which both his legs were broken. This accident was considered suspicious by many. Shortly after the accident President Mugabe demoted Dr. Zvobgo further to Minister Without Portfolio, and, in 2000, Dr. Zvobgo was dropped from Zimbabwe's cabinet altogether.

In the 2002 presidential elections, Zvobgo refused to campaign for Mugabe, but did not endorse the opposition challenger Morgan Tsvangirai, leader of the Movement for Democratic Change (MDC). He also voiced his opposition to the sweeping media law, passed the same year, calling it "the most serious assault on our constitutional liberties since independence".

Despite his criticism, Zvobgo eventually voted for the legislation, which was used to close off Zimbabwe's only privately owned daily newspaper, The Daily News, and to arrest at least 31 independent journalists.

Zvobgo became the subject of an internal party disciplinary inquiry in 2003 for his refusal to campaign for Mugabe and after describing the laws as a weapon to stifle opposition to the government, but allegations of disloyalty were eventually dropped. He was also accused of holding private talks with the opposition Movement for Democratic Change as the ruling party abandoned formal dialogue between the two parties.

Zvobgo died on 22 August 2004 after a lengthy battle with cancer. Dr. Zvobgo is survived by his seven children: Jonasi, Kerina, Mudiwa, Tsungirirai, Tendai, Esther and Farai Emily. He was declared a National Hero and laid to rest at Zimbabwe's National Heroes Acre.

See also 
Politics of Zimbabwe

References 

1935 births
People from Masvingo Province
2004 deaths
Zimbabwe African National Liberation Army personnel
Harvard Law School alumni
Tufts University alumni
Prisoners and detainees of Rhodesia
Deaths from cancer in Zimbabwe
Members of the National Assembly of Zimbabwe
20th-century Zimbabwean politicians
21st-century Zimbabwean politicians
Shona people
Zimbabwean Protestants